Gorgonella is a genus of moths in the family Lasiocampidae. The genus was erected by Vadim V. Zolotuhin in 2000.

References

Lasiocampidae